Brownston is a hamlet in Devon, England. It is located within Modbury Parish.

Its church (dedicated to St John the Baptist) is now a private home and was built in 1844. There is also a converted Wesleyan chapel. Several of the farmhouses in Brownston are grade II listed. It also has a converted school and forge and was a busier place when the road through Brownston was a main route for people travelling from the South Hams area to Plymouth during the gold rush days. Brownston Cross was renamed California Cross at this time.

External links

Brownston community page

Villages in Devon